
The Lac d'Émosson (Lake Émosson) is a reservoir in the canton of Valais, Switzerland. It is located in the municipalities of Salvan and Finhaut. The closest small city in Switzerland is Martigny. The lake has a surface area of 3.27 km² and an elevation of 1,930 m. The maximum depth is 161 m. The purpose of the Émosson Dam is hydroelectric power generation. Water from the reservoir first powers the 189 MW Vallorcine Power Station downstream and just over the border in Vallorcine, France. Water is then sent through a headrace tunnel to the 162 MW La Bâtiaz Power Station,  to the east in Martigny, Switzerland.

The first dam of Émosson (also known as Barberine Dam) was built in 1925. The current dam with a height of 180 m was constructed between 1969 and August 1973 and floods the old dam. The reservoir was fully impounded on 10 September 1975, it increased the reservoir's volume from 40 million m³ to 227 million m³. The old dam can still be seen when the water level in the Lac d'Émosson is very low.

The lake serves as the lower reservoir for the 900 MW Nant de Drance Hydropower Plant which began operations in 2022.

In 1955, another dam was built 300m higher above the now existing lake. This lake is now known as the Lac du Vieux Émosson.

The dam can be reached by road or by a funicular-train-funicular trip. The Funiculaire du Châtelard is the first used from the valley bottom, it is the steepest 2-cabin funicular railway in the world with a gradient of 87 percent.

See also 

 List of lakes of Switzerland
 List of mountain lakes of Switzerland
 Renewable energy in Switzerland

Notes

External links
Cycling profile for climb to Émosson 
Cable car and attraction park
www.emosson.ch

Emosson
Emosson
Emosson
Emosson
Tourist attractions in Switzerland
Funicular railways in Switzerland
Hydroelectric power stations in Switzerland
Hydroelectric power stations in France